Dasypyga alternosquamella is a species of snout moth in the genus Dasypyga. It was described by Émile Louis Ragonot in 1887 and is known from western North America.

The larvae feed on Arceuthobium species, including Arceuthobium vaginatum.

References

Moths described in 1887
Phycitinae